Glinus radiatus is a species of flowering plant in the family Molluginaceae, known by the common name spreading sweetjuice.

It is native to the Pantanal ecoregion of Brazil.

References

Molluginaceae
Flora of Brazil